DSRP is a theory and method of thinking, developed by systems theorist and cognitive scientist Derek Cabrera. It is an acronym that stands for Distinctions, Systems, Relationships, and Perspectives. Cabrera posits that these four patterns underlie all cognition, that they are universal to the process of structuring information, and that people can improve their thinking skills by learning to use the four elements explicitly.

Cabrera distinguishes between the DSRP theory and the DSRP method. The theory is the mathematical formalism and philosophical underpinnings, while the method is the set of tools and techniques people use in real life settings (notably in education).

History
DSRP was first described by Derek Cabrera in the book Remedial Genius. In later writings, Cabrera describes D, S, R, and P as "patterns of thinking", and expands upon the implications of these thinking skills. The DSRP theory is a mathematical formalism of systems thinking and cognition, built on the philosophical underpinnings of constructivism and evolutionary epistemology. The DSRP method is used in education and has influenced educational reform as well as in management of learning organizations.

In 2008, a special section of the journal Evaluation and Program Planning was dedicated to examining the DSRP theory and method.

The 2015 self-published book Systems Thinking Made Simple is an updated treatment of DSRP.

DSRP theory

DSRP consists of four interrelated structures (or patterns), and each structure has two opposing elements. The structures and their elements are:
 Making Distinctions – which consist of an identity and an other
 Organizing Systems – which consist of part and whole
 Recognizing Relationships – which consist of action and reaction
 Taking Perspectives – which consist of point and view

There are several rules governing DSRP:
 Each structure (D, S, R, or P) implies the existence of the other three structures.
 Each structure implies the existence of its two elements and vice versa.
 Each element implies its opposite (e.g. identity implies other).

These rules illustrate that DSRP is a modular, fractal, nonlinear, complex systems process. The four DSRP structures do not occur in a stepwise, linear process but in a highly interdependent, complex way.

DSRP theory states that these four structures are inherent in every piece of knowledge and are universal to all human thinking, and that any piece of information can be viewed using each of these structures to gain a deeper understanding of that information. The order in which the operations take place does not matter, as all four occur simultaneously.

Gerald Midgley pointed out that the structures of DSRP have analogues in other systems theories: distinctions are analogous to the boundaries of Werner Ulrich's boundary critique; Stafford Beer's viable system model explores nested systems (parts and wholes) in ways analogous to the "S" of DSRP; Jay Wright Forrester's system dynamics is an exploration of relationships; and soft systems methodology explores perspectives.

Example
Any piece of information can be analyzed using each of these elements. For example, consider the U.S. Democratic Party. By giving the party a name, Democratic, a distinction is drawn between it and all other entities. In this instance, the Democratic Party is the identity and everything else (including the U.S. Republican Party) is the other. From the perspective of the Republican Party ("identity"), however, the Democratic Party is the other.

The Democratic Party is also a system—it is a whole entity, but it is made up of constituent parts—its membership, hierarchy, values, etc. When viewed from a different perspective, the Democratic Party is just a part of the whole universe of American political parties.

The Democratic Party is in relationship with innumerable other entities, for example, the news media, current events, the American electorate, etc., each of which mutually influence the Party—a relationship of cause and effect. The Party is also a relationship itself between other concepts, for example, between a voter and political affiliation.

The Democratic Party is also a perspective on the world—a point in the political landscape from which to view issues.

Formula
The primary application of the DSRP theory is through its various methodological tools but the theory itself is a mathematical formalism that contributes to the fields of evolutionary epistemology and cognition. The formal theory states that DSRP are simple rules in a complex adaptive system that yields systems thinking:

The equation explains that autonomous agents (information, ideas or things) following simple rules (D,S,R,P) with their elemental pairs (i-o, p-w, a-r, ρ-v) in nonlinear order and with various co-implications of the rules (○), the collective dynamics of which over a time series j to n leads to the emergence of what we might refer to as systems thinking (ST).

The elements of each of the four patterns follow a simple underlying logic as do the interactions between patterns. This logic underlies the unique ability of DSRP to be characterized as multivalent, but contain within it bivalency.

DSRP method
DSRP as a method is built upon two premises: first, that humans build knowledge, with knowledge and thinking being in a continuous feedback loop (e.g., constructivism), and second, that knowledge changes (e.g., evolutionary epistemology). The DSRP method builds upon this constructivist view of knowledge by encouraging users to physically and graphically examine information. Users take concepts and model them with physical objects or diagrams. These objects are then moved around and associated in different ways to represent some piece of information, or content, and its context in terms of distinctions, systems, relationships, or perspectives. Once a concept has been modeled and explored using at least one of the four elements of DSRP, the user goes back to see if the existing model is sufficient for his or her needs, and if not, chooses another element and explores the concept using that. This process is repeated until the user is satisfied with the model.

The DSRP method has several parts, including mindset, root lists, guiding questions, tactile manipulatives, and DSRP diagrams.

Mindset
The DSRP mindset is the paradigmatic shift toward thinking about underlying structure of ideas rather than only the content of speech acts, curriculum, or information of any kind. The DSRP mindset means the person is explicating underlying structure.

Root lists
Root lists are simply lists of various concepts, behaviors, and cognitive functions that are "rooted in" D, S, R, or P. These root lists show the research linkages between the four universal structures and existing structures which users may be more familiar with such as categorization, sorting, cause and effect, etc.

Guiding questions
Guiding questions provide users with something akin to the Socratic method of questioning but using DSRP as the underlying logic. Users pose "guiding questions", of which there are two for each structure of DSRP. The guiding questions are:

 Distinctions
 What is __?
 What is not __?
 Systems 
 Does _ have parts?
 Can you think of _ as a part?
 Relationships   
 Is  related to __?
 Perspectives
 From the perspective of __, [insert question]?

Tactile manipulatives and DSRP diagrams
Users are encouraged to model ideas with blocks or other physical objects, or to draw (diagram) ideas in terms of D, S, R, and P. This aspect of the method is promoted as a form of nonlinguistic representation of ideas, based on research showing that learners acquire and structure knowledge more effectively when information is presented in linguistic and nonlinguistic formats.

Educational outcomes
With continued use, the method is supposed to improve six specific types of thinking skills:
 Critical thinking improves as people learn to examine the reasoning behind the distinctions they draw and the perspectives and relationships that influence how information is presented
 Creative thinking improves as people make connections (i.e. relationships) between new pieces of information.
 Systems thinking improves as one becomes increasingly fluent with all four elements of DSRP.
 Interdisciplinary thinking improves as people reconsider boundaries (i.e. distinctions) and make connections between new pieces of information.
 Scientific thinking improves as people learn to analyze information in a logical way.
 Emotional intelligence and prosocial behavior improves as people learn to take multiple perspectives—particularly to imagine the perspectives of other people.

In addition, the DSRP method is supposed to improve teacher effectiveness.

Applications
Cabrera claims that DSRP theory, as a mathematical and epistemological formalism, and the DSRP method, as a set of cognitive tools, is universally applicable to any field of knowledge.

Education
The DSRP method has been used extensively in educational settings from preschool through post-secondary settings. The DSRP method, as applied in education, is intended to work with existing subject-specific curricula to build thinking skills and provide a way for students to structure content knowledge.

Organizational learning
As a universal theory of systems thinking, DSRP method is in broad use as the basis for organizational learning. The link between organizational learning and systems thinking was made by Peter Senge. DSRP forms the basis of an organizational systems and learning model called VMCL.

Physical, natural, and social sciences
Because its creators claim that DSRP is both an epistemological and an ontological theory (that is, it is predictive not only of what is known but also how new things will come to be known and how those things are actually structured a priori), it could be used not only to deconstruct existing (known) knowledge about any phenomena but also can be used as a predictive and prescriptive tool to advance any area of knowledge about any physical, natural, or social phenomena.

DSRP theory posits that the mind–body problem and symbol grounding problem that causes a disconnect between our knowledge of physical things and the physical world (the basis of systems thinking) is resolved because our universal DSRP cognitive structures evolved within the boundaries and constraints of the physical, chemical, and biological laws. That is, ontological underlying structure of physical things as well as the epistemological underlying structure of ideas is reconciled under DSRP.

Evaluation and program planning
DSRP has been used to apply systems thinking to the fields of evaluation and program planning, including a National Science Foundation-funded initiative to evaluate of large-scale science, technology, engineering, and math (STEM) education programs, as well as evaluations of the complexity science education programs of the Santa Fe Institute.

Software
DSRP provides the conceptual foundation for Plectica, a cloud-based application. The card structure and mapping features tacitly reference DSRP rules and provide an environment in which users can create visual maps of DSRP constructs on any topic or process.

Criticism
Not all experts agree that DSRP is definitive of systems thinking, as Cabrera claims. Gerald Midgley has argued that the "DSRP pattern that Cabrera et al. propose is an interpretation imposed on other perspectives, and they are prepared to dismiss concepts in those perspectives that do not fit." Midgley argued for pragmatic methodological pluralism against unification, and he advised: "Rather than seeking to rationalise the systems thinking field, arguably they [Cabrera et al.] would be better off acknowledging that theirs is one perspective amongst many. It is then up to them to argue its coherence and utility while still keeping the door open to insights from other perspectives."

See also

 Creative problem-solving
 Critical systems thinking
 Conceptual model
 Double-loop learning
 Fallacy of misplaced concreteness
 Function model
 Higher order thinking
 Knowing and the Known
 Mental model
 Metamodeling
 Model-dependent realism
 Pattern language
 Pedagogical patterns
 Perspective (cognitive)
 Problem solving
 Structure chart
 Systems analysis
 Systems theory
 
 View model
 World Hypotheses

References

Further reading

External links
 Cabrera Research Lab

Systems analysis
Systems theory